Sardar Muhammad Aslam Baggra (1910 – unknown) was an Indian field hockey player who competed in the 1932 Summer Olympics.

In 1932 he was a member of the Indian field hockey team, which won the gold medal. He played one match as back.

He was born in modern Faisalabad, Pakistan.

References

External links
 
 Olympic profile

1910 births
Year of death missing
Field hockey players from Punjab, India
Olympic field hockey players of India
Field hockey players at the 1932 Summer Olympics
Indian male field hockey players
Olympic gold medalists for India
Olympic medalists in field hockey
Field hockey players from Faisalabad
Medalists at the 1932 Summer Olympics